The following is the list of members of the Dewan Negara (Senate) of the 15th Malaysian Parliament. 26 out of 70 senators, i.e. two senators for each state, are elected by their respective State Legislative Assembly for three-year term. The other 44, including four senators representing Federal Territories, are appointed by the Yang di-Pertuan Agong also for three-year term.

National Front (BN) remains the majority in the Dewan Negara and remains a part of a governing coalition in the Dewan Rakyat (House of Representatives) led by the Alliance of Hope (PH). This is due to the constitutional nature that senators are not elected directly by the people, but instead elected by the State Legislative Assembly or appointed by the Yang di-Pertuan Agong, which most of senatorial elections or appointments took place in the previous parliamentary term, i.e. the 14th Parliament.

The 15th Parliament is expected to start on 19 December 2022 when all members of the Dewan Rakyat (House of Representatives) elected in the 15th general election will sit for the first time, according to Prime Minister Anwar Ibrahim.

Current composition 

The current composition of the Dewan Negara is correct as of 20 March 2023.

Seating arrangement
This seating arrangement is the current updated arrangement as of 22 December 2022.
 The seating arrangement is viewable at the official website of the Parliament.

Incumbent members

Former members

Notes

References 

15th Parliament of Malaysia
Lists of members of the Dewan Negara
Malaysia